Holiday Secrets is a 2019 German television series starring Corinna Harfouch, Christiane Paul and Svenja Jung. The plot revolves around a gathering for the holidays by three generations of a family, where secrets are slowly making it come apart.

It was released on November 20, 2019 on Netflix.

Cast
 Corinna Harfouch - Eva
 Christiane Paul - Sonja
 Svenja Jung - Vivi
 Leonie Benesch - Lara
 Hans-Uwe Bauer - Olaf
 Dennis Herrmann - Moritz
 Golo Euler - Anton
 Barbara Nüsse - Alma
 Lorna zu Solms - Vivi (young)
 Anita Vulesica - Ljubica
 Tilda Jenkins - Lara (young)
 Maik Solbach - Hans
 Thilo Prothmann - Walter
 Merlin Rose - Peter
 Lisa Hagmeister - Alma (young)
 Eva Bay - Juliana
 Laura von Beloseroff - Ljubica (young)
 Emilie Neumeister - Sonja (young)
 Matti Schmidt-Schaller - Walter (young)
 Ludwig Senger - Anton (young)
 Lucas Lentes - Walter (young)
 Esther Esche - Bettina

Episodes

Release
Holiday Secrets was released on November 20, 2019 on Netflix.

See also
 List of Christmas films

References

External links
 
 

2010s German television series
2010s drama television series
German drama television series
German-language Netflix original programming
Christmas television series